Sai Ronak is an Indian actor and dancer who predominantly works in Telugu cinema. He is known for his role in the film Pressure Cooker.

Career 
Sai Ronak was born as Sai Kiran. While studying engineering, he acted in several films including Pathasala (2014), Guppedantha Prema (2016), and Kaadhali (2017). In The Times of India review of Kaadhali, Ch Sushil Rao wrote that "Sai Ronak and Harish Kalyan had put up sterling performances". He later went on to open his own dance studio in Hyderabad called  Hy Dance Studio. In 2020, he starred in Pressure Cooker. Regarding his performance, Thadhagath Pathi of The Times of India wrote that "Sai Ronak performed well in the lead role and has an impressive screen presence. He carried the role well and if he continues to grow, is a talent to watch out for".

Filmography

References

External links 

Indian male film actors
Living people
Telugu male actors
Male actors in Telugu cinema
1991 births
21st-century Indian male actors